A jiāngshī, also known as a Chinese hopping vampire, is a type of reanimated corpse in Chinese legends and folklore. The characters for "jiāngshī" are read goeng-si in Cantonese. It is typically depicted as a stiff corpse dressed in official garments from the Qing Dynasty, and it moves around by hopping with its arms outstretched. It kills living creatures to absorb their qi, or "life force", usually at night, while during the day, it rests in a coffin or hides in dark places such as caves. Jiangshi legends have inspired a genre of jiangshi films and literature in Hong Kong and East Asia. Although the pronunciation of jiangshi varies in different East Asian countries, but all of them refer only into Chinese version of zombies.

Origins
The Qing Dynasty scholar Ji Xiaolan mentioned in his book Yuewei Caotang Biji (c. 1789 – 1798) (The Shadow Book of Ji Yun, Empress Wu Books, 2021) that the causes for a corpse to be reanimated can be classified in either of two categories: a recently deceased person returning to life, or a corpse that has been buried for a long time but does not decompose. Some causes are described below:

 The use of supernatural arts to resurrect the dead.
 Spirit possession of a dead body.
 A corpse absorbs sufficient yang qi to return to life.
 A person's body is governed by three huns and seven pos. The Qing Dynasty scholar Yuan Mei wrote in his book Zi Bu Yu that "A person's hun is good but the po is evil, the hun is intelligent but the po is not so good". The hun leaves his/her body after death but their po remains and takes control of the body, so the dead person becomes a jiangshi.
 The dead person is not buried even after a funeral has been held. The corpse comes to life after it is struck by a bolt of lightning, or when a pregnant cat (or a black cat in some tales) leaps across the coffin.
 When a person's soul fails to leave their deceased body, due to improper death, suicide, or just wanting to cause trouble.
 A person injured by a jiangshi is infected with the "jiangshi virus" and gradually changes into a jiangshi over time, as seen in the Mr. Vampire films.

Appearance

Generally, a jiangshi's appearance can range from unremarkable (as in the case of a recently deceased person) to horrifying (rotting flesh, rigor mortis, as with corpses that have been in a state of decay over a period). The Chinese character for "jiang" in "jiangshi" literally means "hard" or "stiff". It is believed that the jiangshi are so stiff that they cannot bend their limbs or body, so they have to move around by hopping while keeping their arms stretched out for mobility. Jiangshi are depicted in popular culture to have a paper talisman (with a sealing spell) attached onto and hanging off the forehead in portrait orientation, and wear a uniform coat-like robe and round-top tall rimmed hat characteristic of a mandarin (Chinese official from during the Qing dynasty). A peculiar feature is its greenish-white skin; one theory is that this is derived from fungus or mould growing on corpses. It is said to have long white hair all over its head and may behave like animals. The influence of western vampire stories brought the blood-sucking aspect to the Chinese myth in more modern times in combination with the concept of the hungry ghost, though traditionally they feed solely on the qi of a living individual for sustenance and in order to grow more powerful.

Methods and items used to counter jiangshi
 Mirrors: Li Shizhen's medical book Bencao Gangmu mentions, "A mirror is the essence of liquid metal. It is dark on the external but bright inside." Jiangshi are also said to be terrified of their own reflections.
 Items made of wood from a peach tree: The Jingchu Suishi Ji mentioned, "Peach is the essence of the Five Elements. It can subjugate evil auras and deter evil spirits."
 A rooster's call: Yuan Mei's book Zi Bu Yu mentions, "Evil spirits withdraw when they hear a rooster's call", because the rooster's call usually occurs with the rise of the sun.
 Jujube seeds: Zi Bu Yu mentions, "Nail seven jujube seeds into the acupuncture points on the back of a corpse."
 Fire: Zi Bu Yu mentions, "When set on fire, the sound of crackling flames, blood rushes forth and bones cry."
 Hooves of a black donkey: Mentioned in Zhang Muye's fantasy novel Ghost Blows Out the Light
 Vinegar: Mentioned by coroners in eastern Fujian
 Ba gua sign
 I Ching
 Tong Shu
 Glutinous rice, rice chaff
 Adzuki beans
 Handbell
 Thread stained with a concoction of black ink, chicken blood and burnt talisman
 Blood of a black dog
 Stonemason's awl
 Axe
 Broom
 Holding one's breath
 Taoist talisman, stuck on the forehead to immobilise them whilst it is firmly stuck on
 Dropping a bag of coins can cause the jiangshi to count the coins.
Stephanie Lam in "Hop on Pop: Jiangshi Films in a Transnational Context" lays out the main methods of protecting and fending off the jiangshi.
To subdue a hopping vampire the person must take a thin yellow piece of paper and write out a distinct spell in chicken's blood, which will then be attached to the vampire's forehead.
A person defending themselves against a hopping vampire/zombie can use an 8 sided mirror called Ba-qua mirror, which is often used in Feng Shui. The mirrors purpose is to reflect the light, which in turn scares the creature away.  
A sword charged under the light of the moon made of Chinese coins can be used in an attack against the vampire.
To stop a hopping vampire (zombie) in its place, take a small amount of blood and place it on the creature's forehead.
 To banish the hopping vampire, a person can throw sticky rice at the creature drawing out the evil in it.

Origin stories
A supposed source of the jiangshi stories came from the folk practice of "transporting a corpse over a thousand li". The relatives of a person who died far away from home could not afford vehicles to have the deceased person's body transported home for burial, so they would hire a Taoist priest to conduct a ritual to reanimate the dead person and teach him/her to "hop" their way home. The priests would transport the corpses only at night and would ring bells to notify others in the vicinity of their presence because it was considered bad luck for a living person to set eyes upon a jiangshi. This practice, also called Xiangxi ganshi, was popular in Xiangxi, where many people left their hometown to work elsewhere. After they died, their bodies were transported back to their hometown because it was believed that their souls would feel homesick if they were buried somewhere unfamiliar to them. The corpses would be arranged upright in single file and be tied to long bamboo rods on the sides, while two men (one at the front and one at the back) would carry the ends of the rods on their shoulders and walk. When the bamboo flexed up and down, the corpses appeared to be "hopping" in unison when viewed from a distance away.

Two oral accounts of transporting corpses are included in Liao Yiwu's The Corpse Walker. One account describes how corpses would be transported by a two-man team. One would carry the corpse on his back with a large robe covering both of them and a mourning mask on top. The other man would walk ahead with a lantern and warn his companion about obstacles ahead of him. The lantern was used as a visual guide for the corpse carrier to follow since they could not see with the robe covering them. It is speculated in the accounts in the book that corpses would be carried at night to avoid contact with people and the cooler air would be more suitable to transporting bodies.

Some speculate that the stories about jiangshi were originally made up by smugglers who disguised their illegal activities as corpse transportation and wanted to scare off law enforcement officers.

Their modern visual depiction as horrific Qing officials may have been derived by the anti-Manchu or anti-Qing sentiments of the Han Chinese population during the Qing Dynasty, as the officials were viewed as bloodthirsty creatures with little regard for humanity.

It is also the conventional wisdom of feng shui in Chinese architecture that a threshold, a piece of wood approximately 15 cm (6 in) high, be installed along the width of the door at the bottom to prevent a jiangshi from entering the household.

Literature

Similar practices
Archaeologists have found Revenant and what appear to be deviant burials dating back to 4500–3800 BC in Cyprus. Those born as illegitimate children, with abnormalities, or on inauspicious days, or who were victims of murder, drowning, suicide, curses, or the Black Death were thought to have had the potential to be a vampire. A suspected vampire would be incinerated or dismembered to prevent their return. Other preventive methods included deep buried burial, prone burials, and tying, staking, or pinning corpses with stones. These types of burials have been discovered in numerous locations, including Egypt, Greece, and Rome. Slavic folklore references vampires and preventions dating back to the 11th century with Drawsko, Poland being home to some of these burial sites and early discoveries of such practices. The three primary areas of focus upon burial to prevent vampirism were the mouth, the hands, and the feet, as the mouth is used for feeding, the hands are used for grasping victims, and the feet are used for movement. Folklore and burial practices dealing with revenants can also be traced back to Norse mythology with draugr or draug(s) that closely resemble stories of jiangshis.  These draugr were also re-animated corpses that rose from their graves, and many of the various accounts report the draugr to be sighted far from its initial burial site.

See also

 Chinese ghosts
 Chinese mythology
 Chupacabra
 Draugr
 Medieval revenant
 Undead
 Vetala
 Wight
 Yaoguai
 Yokai
 Yurei
 Zombie
 Vampire burial

References

External links 
 

 
Chinese folklore
Chinese legendary creatures
Corporeal undead
Monsters
Mythological monsters
Supernatural legends
Yaoguai
Yōkai
Vampires
Zombies
Chinese ghosts